Came the Brawn is a 1938 Our Gang short comedy film directed by Gordon Douglas. Produced by Hal Roach and released to theaters by Metro-Goldwyn-Mayer, it was the 165th entry in the Our Gang series.

Notes
Came the Brawn marked Spanky McFarland's, Tommy "Butch" Bond's, Sidney "Woim" Kibrick's, and Darwood "Waldo" Kaye's final appearances in the Hal Roach-produced Our Gang shorts. Butch, Woim, and Waldo were recurring characters and would not be needed for the last three episodes but would all return for The Little Ranger, the first Our Gang short produced after the series' sale to MGM in mid-1938.

Spanky's contract expired after the completion of Came the Brawn, and he officially retired from the series at this time. After going on a personal tour, Spanky rejoined Our Gang in the late summer of 1938, after its transfer to MGM. He would remain another four and a half years.

Cast

The Gang
 Darla Hood as Darla
 Eugene Lee as Porky
 George McFarland as Spanky
 Carl Switzer as Alfalfa
 Billie Thomas as Buckwheat

Additional cast
 Tommy Bond as Butch
 Darwood Kaye as Waldo
 Sidney Kibrick as Woim
 Henry Lee as Spike
 Billy Minderhout as Kid with big eyes
 Roger Terry as 'Wise fella'
 Ernest Wechbaugh as Kid with too much muscle
 Betsy Gay as Effie (scene deleted)

Audience extras
Patsy Currier, Charles Flickinger, Joe Geil, Paul Hilton, Cheryl Hopper, Tommy McFarland, Dicke De Nuet, Raymond Rayhill Powell, Spencer Quinn, Drew Roddy, Harold Switzer, Voigt Williams, David Wilmot

See also
 Our Gang filmography

References

External links

1938 films
1938 comedy films
1938 short films
American black-and-white films
Films directed by Gordon Douglas
Hal Roach Studios short films
Our Gang films
1930s American films